Clyde Edgar Keeler (April 11, 1900 – April 22, 1994) was a medical geneticist who is noted for his work on laboratory mice and the genetics of vision.  His work was instrumental in the understanding of retinitis pigmentosa.  He also seems to have published the first scientific paper on non-rod non-cone visual sensation.

Short biographies may be found at the web site of Georgia College, which keeps the Clyde E. Keeler collection, and at the Guggenheim Foundation, where he was made a Fellow in 1938.  His daughter, Irmgard Keeler Howard, wrote a three-page obituary for The Journal of Heredity and he self-published an autobiography, The Gene Hunter.

References

20th-century American zoologists
American geneticists
People from Marion, Ohio
1900 births
1994 deaths
Harvard University alumni
Scientists from Ohio